Chuck Hunter is a Democratic member of the Montana Legislature.  He was elected to House District 79 which represents a portion of the Lewis and Clark County area.

Hunter served as Minority Leader of the House during the 2015-2016 session.

References

External links
Home page

Year of birth missing (living people)
Living people
Democratic Party members of the Montana House of Representatives
Politicians from Helena, Montana
Place of birth missing (living people)